Pieters is a Dutch surname, equivalent to Peters. It can refer to:

Amy Pieters (b. 1991), Dutch racing cyclist 
Andries Jan Pieters (1916–1952), Dutch collaborator with Nazis who was executed for war crimes
Brandon Pieters (b. 1976), South African professional golfer
Bruno Pieters, Belgian fashion designer 
Carle M. Pieters (b. 1943), American planetary scientist 
Cindy Pieters (b. 1976), Belgian racing cyclist 
Danny Pieters (b. 1956), Belgian politician
Deane Pieters (b. 1968), Australian swimmer
Dewald Pieters (b. 1990), South African rugby player
Eddy Pieters Graafland (b. 1934), Dutch footballer
Erik Pieters (b. 1988) Dutch footballer
Fabio Pieters (b. 1978), Argentine footballer
Geertje Pieters (1636–1712), Dutch flower painter
Godfried Pieters (b. 1936), Dutch sculptor
Guido Pieters (b. 1948), Dutch film director
Jean Pieters (b. 1962), Dutch biochemist
Josh Pieters, South African YouTuber
Kim Pieters (b. 1959), New Zealand painter, musician and video artist
Peter Pieters (b. 1962), Dutch racing cyclist 
Sven Pieters (b. 1976), Belgian sprint hurdler

See also
3713 Pieters

Dutch-language surnames
Patronymic surnames
Surnames from given names